Radu G. Vlădescu (1886 – 1964), a Romanian professor born in Buzău, taught at the Faculty of Veterinary Medicine of the University of Agronomical Sciences and Veterinary Medicine, Bucharest. He was a member of the Romanian Academy and correspondent member of the French Academy.

Academic staff of the University of Agronomic Sciences and Veterinary Medicine of Bucharest
Titular members of the Romanian Academy
People from Buzău
1886 births
1964 deaths